The Collins–Valentine line, or Valentine–Collins line, is the boundary at approximately 45 degrees north latitude that separates the province of Quebec from the states of New York and Vermont. It was surveyed and marked by survey monuments in 1771–3 by John Collins, surveyor-general of Quebec, and Thomas Valentine, a commissioner appointed by the government of New York.

Quebec had been governed by France until the conclusion of the Seven Years' War in 1763, after which it was governed by Britain. In the 1760s, the region that would later become the state of Vermont was considered by authorities in Britain and New York to be a part of what was then called the Province of New York, although that status was a matter of some dispute among New York, New Hampshire, Massachusetts, and the inhabitants of the disputed territory. Thus the boundary was intended to be between Quebec and New York. In the Gazetteer of the State of New York, we read that:By royal proclamation, issued in Oct. 1763, the line 45° N. was fixed as the boundary between the provinces of Quebec and New York, and this was confirmed in council Aug. 12, 1768. The line was surveyed by Valentine and Collins, Oct. 20, 1774.

The Treaty of Paris of 1783, which established peace between Britain and the United States, said the boundary was to be the 45th parallel, and it was generally assumed that that is where the line marked by monuments is.

Joseph Bouchette, writing about the re-survey agreed upon in the Treaty of Ghent, states that:In determining the geographical boundary between St. Regis and the Connecticut River, it was soon discovered that the original demarcation of the 45th parallel of north latitude widely deviated from the true course of that parallel, the position of which was carefully ascertained by the joint observations of the British and American astronomers employed on that service in 1818. It was found that the pre-existing line was drawn almost wholly north of the true geographical bearing of that circle of latitude . . . at St. Regis the old line was actually 1375 feet, statute measure, north of the 45° of north latitude, and that Ellicott's line [surveyed the previous year] was 30 feet too far north . . .  The Webster–Ashburton Treaty of 1842 said that the measurement errors stand, so the boundary is where Collins and Valentine erected the monuments.

The Collins–Valentine line passes directly through a number of buildings, sometimes called line houses. Most notable among these is the Haskell Free Library and Opera House. All of these were built before an international treaty forbade building within three meters (about ten feet) of the boundary without authorization from the International Boundary Commission. Today  the Commission maintains survey monuments along the Collins–Valentine line, as along the rest of the Canada–United States border, and keeps the line clear of brush and vegetation.

See also 

 Mason–Dixon line, surveyed in the 1760s, separating Pennsylvania from three states to its south

References 

Borders of Quebec
Borders of Vermont
Borders of New York (state)
Canada–United States border
Geography of Montérégie
Geography of Estrie
Geography of Franklin County, New York
Geography of Clinton County, New York
Geography of Franklin County, Vermont
Geography of Orleans County, Vermont
Geography of Essex County, Vermont
Eponymous border lines